Palisade cells are plant cells located on the leaves, right below the epidermis and cuticle that is the outermost layer of the leaf. In simpler terms, they are known as leaf cells. Palisade means "stake" in Latin, they are vertically elongated and are stacked side by side, a different shape from the spongy mesophyll cells beneath them. The chloroplasts in these cells absorb a major portion of the light energy used by the leaf. Palisade cells occur in dicotyledonous plants, and also in the net-veined Monocots, the Araceae and Dioscoreaceae.

Structures
Palisade cells contain the largest number of chloroplasts per cell, which makes them the primary site of photosynthesis  in the leaves of those plants that contain them, maximizing the production of energy, converting the energy in light to the chemical energy of carbohydrates.

References
Beneath the palisade mesophyll are the spongy mesophyll cells, which also perform photosynthesis. They are irregularly shaped cells that have many intercellular spaces that allow the passage of gases. There are also guard cells that allow the gases to exchange. The guard cells are collectively known as a stoma derived from the Greek word meaning mouth and plural stomata. 

Holt Science & Technology "Microorganisms, Fungi, and Plants", Holt, Rinehart and Winston

 McAlister, Dinah. “Palisade Cell Function.” Study.com | Take Online Courses. Earn College Credit. Research Schools, Degrees & Careers, 26 Jan. 2022.
 This is a website published for students do to research, so it should be a reliable source. It also covers the topic in some depth, so it's helpful in establishing notability.
 Kozuka, Toshiaki, et al. “Tissue-Autonomous Promotion of Palisade Cell Development by Phototropin 2 in Arabidopsis.” The Plant Cell, American Society of Plant Biologists, Oct. 2011.
 This is a biotechnology center that covers plant cells and they go more in depth in palisade cell.

Plant cells

de:Parenchym#Bei Pflanzen